Sport and Pastime was a weekly sports magazine published by The Hindu Group from 1947 to 1968. Founded by S. K. Gurunathan, the magazine was eventually stopped in 1968. It was replaced with Sportstar in 1978.

References

1947 establishments in India
1968 disestablishments in India
Defunct magazines published in India
Sports magazines published in India
Weekly magazines published in India
Magazines established in 1947
Magazines disestablished in 1968